Ahla Dounya (English: The Most Beautiful World) is the fourth studio album by Lebanese singer Elissa released by Rotana on 19 April 2004, making it her first album released by Rotana Records. The album was a wide success in the Arab world, and achieved sales of more than 3.4 million copies in 2004 and topped the charts in Arab countries for several months. Elissa won the World Music Award for Best Selling Artist in the Middle East and North Africa at a ceremony in Los Angeles, becoming the first Lebanese artist to receive the honor.

For the album, Elissa received the Best Female Singer award at the Murex d'Or ceremony and the Best Music Video award for her song "Hobak Wajaa". Ahla Dounya was the first Arabic album to be recorded using "Super Audio" technology, the latest innovation in sound technology at the time. The album's titular song "Ahla Dounya" has been translated into songs in other languages, including Bulgarian, Portuguese, and Bosnian.

Track listing
All tracks produced by Jean-Marie Riachi.

Notes
"Bein Il Ein" is an Arabic-language cover of the 2003 Turkish song "Dile Benden" by İzel.
On pressings issued by Founoon, a 2 minute 20 second instrumental of "Law Nirjaa Sawa" is included as track 7. Additionally, alternate versions of "Irjaa Lilshowk", "Irham Albi" and "Karibli" are included.

Credits and personnel

Personnel
Adapted from the album liner notes.

 Jean-Marie Riachi - executive producer, arranger, keyboards
 Xavier Escabasse - sound engineer
 Philippe Hervwett - guitar
 Gilbert - kanun
 Ali Madbouh - mizmar, ney
 Raymond Hajj - percussion
 Chahe Kupelian - arrangement, programming assistant (tracks 5, 9, 10)
 Didier Forget - saxophone
 Christian Martinez - trumpet
 Jihad Akl - violin
 Paul Tachdjian - programming assistant
 Tony Haddad - digital mastering
 Ziad Nawfal - translator
 David Abdullah - photography
 Bassam Fattouh - make-up
 Yehia and Zakaria - hair

Credits
5.1 surround sound mastering by Galaxy Studios (London, England)
5.1 surround sound mixing by Studio Damiens (France)
Design and artwork by Mind the Gap (Beirut, Lebanon)

References

Elissa (singer) albums
Rotana Records albums
2004 albums